Wooloowin railway station is located on the North Coast line in Queensland, Australia. It serves the Brisbane suburb of Wooloowin.

History 

Prior to 1899 the station was named Lutwyche. Station buildings were completed in 1901.

On 29 November 1999, two extra platforms opened as part of the quadruplication of the line from Bowens Hills to Northgate.

Services
Wooloowin station is served daily by the Airport, Doomben and Shorncliffe lines. Also see Inner City timetable

Services by Platform

References

External links

Wooloowin station Queensland Rail
Wooloowin station Queensland's Railways on the Internet
[ Wooloowin station] TransLink travel information

Railway stations in Brisbane
North Coast railway line, Queensland